Kita Nord is a rural commune in the Cercle of Kita in the Kayes Region of south-western Mali. The commune includes 8 villages and in the 2009 census had a population of 9,882. The principal village is Sibikily.

References

External links
.

Communes of Kayes Region